John Mortimer (2 July 1931 – 2 September 1992) professionally Johnnie Mortimer, was a British scriptwriter for British TV whose work, along with creative writing partner Brian Cooke, also served as inspiration for American television projects.

Life and career 
He was born in Clare, Suffolk. He started out as a cartoonist, which brought him into contact with his writing partner Brian Cooke. Mortimer later wrote series for radio such as The Men from the Ministry and Round the Horne, before writing many TV situation comedies including Foreign Affairs, Father, Dear Father, Man About the House, Never the Twain, Robin's Nest and George and Mildred, often working in partnership with Cooke. Versions of Man about the House, George & Mildred and Robin's Nest were later adapted as Three's Company, The Ropers and Three's A Crowd respectively.

The partnership also wrote two plays, the first a theatrical version of George and Mildred (later renamed When the Cat's Away after the death of actress Yootha Joyce who played Mildred). The second was Situation Comedy, and featured two TV situation comedy writers struggling to come up with an idea for a new series (in the end, they write a stage play instead).

References

External links
 List of shows written by Johnnie Mortimer from bbc.co.uk Comedy Guide
 

1931 births
1992 deaths
British television writers
British television composers
British cartoonists
20th-century classical musicians
20th-century British composers
People from Clare, Suffolk
20th-century screenwriters